Marta Samuel Alberto (born 10 February 1995) is an Angolan handball player for Primeiro de Agosto and the Angolan national team.

She represented Angola at the 2017 World Women's Handball Championship in Germany.

References

Angolan female handball players
1995 births
Living people
African Games medalists in handball
African Games gold medalists for Angola
Competitors at the 2015 African Games